The Finnish national under-21 football team is the national under-21 football team of Finland. The team qualified for the UEFA European Under-21 Football Championship final tournament in 2009.

UEFA U-21 Championship Record

2023 UEFA Euro Under-21 qualification

Current squad

The following players have been called up for the Antalya Cup friendly matches against North Macedonia on 25 March 2023, and Bulgaria on 28 March 2023.

 Caps and goals as of 10 June 2022 after the match against Norway.

|-----
! colspan="9" bgcolor="#B0D3FB" align="left" |

|-----
! colspan="9" bgcolor="#B0D3FB" align="left" |

|-----
! colspan="9" bgcolor="#B0D3FB" align="left" |

Recent callups

The following players have also been called up to the Finland under-21 squad and remain eligible:

! colspan="9" bgcolor="#B0D3FB" align="left" |

|-----
! colspan="9" bgcolor="#B0D3FB" align="left" |

|-----
! colspan="9" bgcolor="#B0D3FB" align="left" |

|-----
! colspan="10" bgcolor="#B0D3FB" align="left" |

 INJ = Withdrew due to an injury.

Coaching staff

Past squads
 2009 UEFA European Under-21 Football Championship squad

See also
 Finland national football team
 Finland national under-19 football team
 Finland national under-17 football team
 Finland national under-21 football team at UEFA web pages

References

European national under-21 association football teams
Finland national football team